Franco "Bifo" Berardi (born 2 November 1949) is an Italian Marxist philosopher, theorist and activist in the autonomist tradition, whose work mainly focuses on the role of the media and information technology within post-industrial capitalism. Berardi has written over two dozen published books, as well as a number of essays and speeches.

Creative work and activism 
In 1962, at the age of 13, Berardi became a member of the Italian Communist Youth Federation, but was expelled due to "factionalism." He participated in the events of May '68 at the University of Bologna, where he graduated with a degree in Aesthetics. During this time he joined the extra-parliamentary Worker's Power group and met Antonio Negri. Berardi founded the magazine A/traverso in 1975 and worked with the magazine until 1981, when it reached its high point of publishing. He was also part of the staff of Radio Alice, the first free pirate radio station in Italy, from 1976 to 1978.

Like others involved in the political movement of Autonomia in Italy during the 1970s, Berardi fled to Paris, where he worked with Félix Guattari in the field of schizoanalysis. During the 1980s, Berardi contributed to the magazines Semiotexte (New York), Chimerees (Paris), Metropoli (Rome) and Musica 80 (Milan). During the 1990s, he published Mutazione e Ciberpunk (Genoa, 1993), Cibernauti (Rome, 1994), and Félix (Rome, 2001). He has also collaborated with artists such as Warren Neidich and publications such as e-flux in the contemporary arts field. Currently he is working with the magazine Derive Approdi as well as teaching social history of communication at the Accademia di belle Arti in Milan. He is the co-founder of the e-zine rekombinant.org and of the telestreet movement, founding the channel Orfeo TV.

Theories
Unlike orthodox Marxists, Berardi's autonomist theories draw on psychoanalysis, schizoanalysis and communication theory to show how subjectivity and desire are bound up with the functioning of the capitalist system, rather than portraying events such as the financial crisis of 2008 merely as an example of the inherently contradictory logic of capitalist accumulation. Thus, he argues against privileging labour in critique and says that "the solution to the economic difficulty of the situation cannot be solved with economic means: the solution is not economic." Human emotions and embodied communication becomes increasingly central to the production and consumption patterns that sustain capital flows in post-industrial society, and as such Berardi uses the concepts of "cognitariat" and "info labour" to analyze this psycho-social process. Among Berardi's other concerns are cultural representations and expectations about the future — from proto-Fascist Futurism to post-modern cyberpunk (1993). This represents a greater concern with ideas and cultural expectations than the determinist-materialist expression of a Marxism which is often confined to purely economic or systemic analysis.

The Uprising and Breathing

Two of Berardi's books, The Uprising and Breathing, are closely related speculative works which treat the global financial crisis, financial capitalism and the subsequent protest movements of the early 21st century such as Occupy Wall Street and the Arab Spring.  In both works Berardi criticizes neoliberal financial capitalism, claiming that its supporting infrastructure of automation (e.g. computer trading on the stock market)—together with standardized computer language conventions on social media (e.g. the like button on Facebook)—hollow out language to the detriment of human actors who naturally communicate in more sensuous and subjective ways.  As remedies Berardi suggests poetry and "chaos"—citing the elegies of Rilke and Guattari's work on chaos—as methods for human subjects to overcome the lived experience of market logic.  Additionally both books cite the work of Deleuze and Guattari, Marx's Fragment on Machines from the Grundrisse, the Tractatus Logico-Philosophicus by Wittgenstein, and Symbolic Exchange and Death by Baudrillard.

The Uprising

In The Uprising Berardi rejects economic discourse, asserting that economics itself is not a science but rather a form of political ideology.  Consequently he further rejects the notion that neoliberal economic policy is based in the objectivity of science, but is instead merely a political program and an undesirable one.  Against the mathematical language of economics (which he alleges masquerades as scientific) Berardi opposes a speculative (and also unscientific) rhetoric of poetry, which he intends to disrupt the conventional wisdom of contemporary economics.

Berardi decries the automation and standardization of language via computer technology, which he alleges results in an impoverished language as experienced by the human subject, with the result that it is more difficult to conceptualize another form of life apart from the current economic/political situation.  He also criticizes the fragmentation of precarious work (e.g. seasonal work, telecommuting) which leads to social atomization and precludes social solidarity, and further rejects neoliberal and conservative economic views. As remedies, Berardi proposes both a rediscovery of poetic language which speaks directly to humans, and also a redirection of the general intellect—a Marxist term deriving from the Grundrisse, referring to the cognitive capacity of society—away from capitalism and towards social solidarity.

Breathing

In Breathing, Berardi uses respiration as a metaphor to discuss modern society. Beginning with his own asthma and the death of Eric Garner, he advances the notion that humanity is experiencing a "breathlessness" in all areas of life as a result of being out of sync with contemporary capitalism and technology.  The book continues several of the themes previously treated in The Uprising.

Berardi cites Chaosmosis, a text by Félix Guattari, to establish a dichotomy of rhythm and chaos.  This dichotomy is then compared with (regular and irregular) breathing and the alleged tension between humans and capitalist society.

The rhetorical suggestion is that humanity is obliged to "shake off" capitalism in a spasm which will allow the social body to "breathe regularly" again, in a new rhythm.

Later, Berardi examines other alleged social ills of the early 21st century.  He cites the novels of Jonathan Franzen as providing "insight into what is happening to the American mind, and particularly to the American unconscious, during the reign of Trump... the living brain of America is decaying, seized by anxiety and depression, furiously looking for scapegoats and for revenge." Berardi criticizes the virtual reality of dating apps (juxtaposed with reports of decreased sexual activity among millennials) and internet forum posts by the American hacker and troll weev as further examples of sickness in society.  As proposed remedies, Berardi returns to poetry and the notion of seeking different rhythms of life.

Bibliography (selected)

Books 

 The Third Unconscious: The Psychosphere in the Viral Age. London & New York: Verso Books, 2021. ISBN 9781839762536
The Second Coming. Cambridge: Polity Press, 2019. ISBN 1509534849
 Breathing: Chaos and Poetry. Cambridge, Mass.: Semiotext(e) / Intervention Series, 2018. ISBN 1635900387
 Futurability: The Age of Impotence and the Horizon of Possibility. London & New York: Verso Books, 2017. ISBN 1784787442
 And: Phenomenology of the end. Cambridge, Mass.: Semiotext(e), 2015. ISBN 1584351705
 Heroes: Mass Murder and Suicide. London & New York: Verso Books, 2015. ISBN 1781685789
 The Uprising: On Poetry and Finance. Cambridge, Mass.: Semiotext(e) / Intervention Series, 2012. ISBN 1584351128
 After the Future. Edited by Gary Genosko and Nicholas Thoburn. Oakland & Edinburgh: AK Press, 2011. ISBN 1849350590
 The Soul at Work: From Alienation to Autonomy. Translated by Francesca Cadel and Giuseppina Mecchia, with preface by Jason E. Smith. Los Angeles, CA: Semiotexte, 2009. ISBN 1584350768
 With Marco Jacquement and Gianfranco Vitali. Ethereal Shadows: Communications and Power in Contemporary Italy. London: Autonomedia, 2009.
 Precarious Rhapsody. Semio-capitalism and the Pathologies of the Post-Alpha Generation. London: Autonomedia, 2009.
 Skizomedia. Trent'anni di mediattivismo. Untranslated: Schizomedia: Thirty Years of Media Activism. Rome: Derive Approdi, 2006.
 Il sapiente, il mercante, il guerriero: dal rifiuto del lavoro all'emergere del cognitariato Untranslated: The Warrior, The Merchant, and the Sage: the Emergence of the Cognitariat Refusal of Work. Rome: DeriveApprodi, 2004.
 With Jacquement e Vitali and Baldini Castoldi Dalai. Telestreet. Macchina immaginativa non omologata. Untranslated: Telestreet: Machine Imagination Not Approved. 2003.
 Alice è il diavolo. Storia di una radio sovversiva. Untranslated: Alice is the Devil: Story of a Subversive Radio. Shake, 2002.
 Un'estate all'inferno. Untranslated: Summer in Hell. Ed. Luca Sossella. 2002.
 Félix. Narrazione del mio incontro con il pensiero di Guattari, cartografia visionaria del tempo che viene. Translated: Félix Guattari. Thought, Friendship, and Visionary Cartography. London: Palgrave, 2008.
 La fabbrica dell'infelicita'. New economy e movimento del cognitariato. Untranslated: The Factory of Unhappiness: New Economy and Movement of the Cognitariat. Rome: DeriveApprodi, 2001.
 La nefasta utopia di Potere Operaio. Untranslated: The Ominous Utopia of Workers' Power. Castelvecchi, 1997.
 Exit, il nostro contributo all'estinzione della civilta. Untranslated: Exit – Our Contribution to the Extinction of Civilization.
 Cibernauti. Untranslated: Cybernauts. Castelvecchi, 1995.
 Come si cura il nazi, Neuromagma. Untranslated: How is the Nazi, Neuromagma. 1994.
 Mutazione e cyberpunk. Untranslated: Mutation and Cyberpunk. 1993.
 Piu' cyber che punk. Untranslated: More Cyber Than Punk. 1990.
 Infovirus. Untranslated. Topia. 1985.
 Enfin le ciel est tombè sur la terre. Untranslated: Finally the Sky Fell to the Earth. Seuil, 1978.
 Contro il lavoro. Untranslated: Against Work. Milano: Feltrinelli, 1970.

Essays and speeches 
 "Futurism and the reversal of the future". London: May 2009.
 "Communism is back but we should call it the therapy of singularisation". London: February 2009.
 "The Post-Futurist Manifesto". Trans. R. W. Flint. 2009.
 "Biopolitics and Connective Mutation". Culture Machine, Vol. 7, 2005.
 "What is the Meaning of Autonomy Today: Subjectivation, Social Composition, Refusal of Work". Replicart. September 2003.
 "The Obsession with Identity Fascism". Trans. Steve Wright. From The Ominous Utopia of Worker Control (Untranslated text, 1997).
 "Info Labour and Precarity". Trans. Eric Empson.

Filmography 
 The Move (documentary). Directed by Renato de Maria. 1991.

See also 

 Gilles Deleuze
 Michel Foucault
 Félix Guattari
 Maurizio Lazzarato
 Antonio Negri
 Post-structuralism
 Post-Marxism
 Paolo Virno

Notes

References

External links 
 Biography at Generation-Online
 Biography at Affinity Project
 Franco Berardi's author page on Through Europe
 Irony and the Politics of Composition in the Philosophy of Franco "Bifo" Berardi. Extensive essay on Berardi's political and philosophical trajectory from the 1960s activism with Potere Operaio to Radio Alice and Autonomia to his contemporary analysis of the networked society.
 Interview with Franco Berardi for Ràdio Web MACBA (2011). Museu d’Art Contemporani de Barcelona.
 Review of Franco Berardi's After the Future by Ben Lear on Viewpoint Magazine
 (Interview)

1949 births
Living people
Italian anti-capitalists
Italian Marxists
Italian communists
Autonomism
Continental philosophy
Refusal of work
Marxist theorists
Critics of work and the work ethic